Russell Square is a London Underground station opposite Russell Square on Bernard Street, Bloomsbury, in the London Borough of Camden. The station is on the Piccadilly line, between Holborn and King's Cross St Pancras and is in Travelcard Zone 1.

Russell Square Station is not far from the British Museum, the University of London's main campus, Great Ormond Street Hospital, Russell Square Gardens and the Brunswick Centre.

The station is the work of London architect Leslie Green and is example of the Modern Style (British Art Nouveau style).

History
The station was opened by the Great Northern, Piccadilly and Brompton Railway on 15 December 1906. The station was designed by Leslie Green. On 20 July 2011, English Heritage gave the station buildings Grade II listed status, describing it as:

2005 London bombings

On 7 July 2005, in a co-ordinated bomb attack, an explosion in a train travelling between King's Cross St. Pancras and Russell Square resulted in the deaths of 26 people. Another bomb later exploded on a bus at Tavistock Square.

A plaque remembering the victims, identical to the one at King's Cross St Pancras tube station, is located at the station.

The station today
The station is a Grade II listed building.

Russell Square station has three lifts, which are all fifty-passenger lifts built by Wadsworth. There are no escalators but the platforms can be reached using a spiral staircase with 176 steps. 

The station has seven gates and a Wifi service,.

Platform level tiling

The stations on the central part of the Piccadilly line, as well as some sections of the Northern line, were financed by Charles Yerkes, and are famous for the Leslie Green designed red station buildings and distinctive platform tiling. Each station had its own unique tile pattern and colours.

Services and connections
Train frequencies vary throughout the day, but generally operate every 4–7 minutes between 05:56 and 00:28 in both directions.

London Buses routes 14, 59, 68, 91, 168, 188, peak-hour express X68 and night route N91 serve the station.

In popular culture
Russell Square tube station was used as the location for the 1972 horror film Death Line, which starred Donald Pleasence, Christopher Lee and Clive Swift.

References

Bibliography

External links

Piccadilly line stations
London Underground Night Tube stations
Former Great Northern, Piccadilly and Brompton Railway stations
Tube stations in the London Borough of Camden
Railway stations in Great Britain opened in 1906
Buildings and structures in Bloomsbury
Leslie Green railway stations
Grade II listed buildings in the London Borough of Camden
Grade II listed railway stations